Clear is the third studio album by American rock band Spirit. It was released in August 1969 by Ode Records.

The album was written largely in the wake of Spirit's work on the soundtrack to the 1968 film Model Shop. Several of the band members have said that they felt there wasn't enough time for developing the album after releasing two albums in 1968, recording a soundtrack and constantly touring. The album contains "So Little Time To Fly", "Dark Eyed Woman" and "New Dope In Town", as well as three instrumentals.

Critical reception 
Reviewing for The Village Voice in 1969, Robert Christgau called Spirit "a talented group with guts of cellophane" and lead vocalist/guitarist Randy California "the rock equivalent of the cool, progressive jazzman of the '50s". He commended the album for focusing the better songs on side one of the LP, saying its "mostly excellent rock" shows Spirit "can be very good", but found songs like "Ice" on side two indicative of how "incredibly empty" the band can be as well.

1996 re-release
The original Ode Records recording of Clear would be later restored by Sony in 1996. The second edition includes both sides of the "1984" single, the song "Fuller Brush Man" (which hasn't appeared elsewhere), and a piece entitled "Coral", which is also available on the Model Shop soundtrack but is present here in an elaborately produced version. "Coral" is a dedication to groupie Coral Shields, the 11-year-old sister of Sable Starr whom Randy California was dating at the time.

Track listing

Personnel

Spirit 
Jay Ferguson – lead and backing vocals, percussion
Randy California – guitars, backing and lead vocals
John Locke – keyboards
Mark Andes – bass, backing vocals
Ed Cassidy – drums, percussion

Production 
Lou Adler – Producer
Vic Anesini – Mastering, Mixing
Stachowaik – Engineer
Steiner – Engineer
Weinbang – Engineer
Adam Block – Project Director
Jeff Smith – Design
Tom Wilkes – Design 
Guy Webster – Photography

Charts 
Album

References

External links 
 

Spirit (band) albums
1969 albums
Epic Records albums
Legacy Recordings albums
Albums produced by Lou Adler
Ode Records albums